Jason Allen (born 17 August 1981 in Christchurch) is a New Zealand cyclist with 30 national titles, an Oceania title, represented his country at the Commonwealth Games and also won two gold medals at the Track Cycling World Cup.

He was Marlborough Sportsperson of the Year. He rode for the Subway-Avanti team from 2009 till 2011.

Major results
2002
 1st Stage 4 Tour of Southland
2003
 1st Stage 1 Tour de Vineyards 
2004
1st Team pursuit UCI World Cup Classics, Sydney
2nd Team pursuit UCI World Cup Classics, Los Angeles
2005
 1st Stage 7 Tour of Southland
 2nd Tour of Somerville
 Oceania Games
1st Pursuit
1st Team pursuit
1st Team pursuit UCI World Cup Classics, Manchester
 2nd National Track Championships - Madison (with Anthony Chapman)
2007
 1st Stage 9 Tour de la Nouvelle-Calédoni
2009
 3rd National Road Race Championships
2011
 1st Stage 1 TTTTour of Southland
 7th Ocbc Cycle Classic Singapore
2016
 1st Stage 1 TTTTour of Southland

References

1981 births
Living people
New Zealand male cyclists
Cyclists at the 2006 Commonwealth Games
Cyclists from Christchurch
Commonwealth Games medallists in cycling
Commonwealth Games bronze medallists for New Zealand
20th-century New Zealand people
21st-century New Zealand people
Medallists at the 2006 Commonwealth Games